A statue of John Wesley, an Anglican minister and theologian, by British sculptor John Adams-Acton is installed outside Wesley's Chapel, along City Road, in Shoreditch, London, United Kingdom. The statue, created in 1891, is Grade II-listed. The 10 foot high granite pedestal on which the statue is located was the work of the Methodist architect Elijah Hoole.

See also
 List of public art in Islington

References

External links
 

1891 establishments in England
1891 sculptures
Grade II listed buildings in the London Borough of Islington
Monuments and memorials in London
Outdoor sculptures in London
Sculptures of men in the United Kingdom
Wesley, John